A Master of Science in Information Assurance (abbreviated MSIA) is a type of postgraduate academic master's degree awarded by universities in many countries. This degree is typically studied for in information assurance.

Curriculum Structure
The Master of Science in Information Assurance is a one to three years Master Degree; depending on the program, some may even start with two-year preparation classes and covers various areas of computer science, Internet security, Computer security, and or cyber security.

Topics of study may include:

 Business continuity planning
 CobiT
 Countermeasure (computer)
 Disaster recovery
 Factor Analysis of Information Risk
 Fair information practice
 Forensic science
 Information security
 ISO 17799
 ISO/IEC 27002
 IT risk management
 Long-term support
 Management science
 Mission assurance
 PCI DSS
 Regulatory compliance
 Risk assessment
 Risk IT
 Risk factor (computing)
 Risk management
 Security controls
 Security engineering
 Systems engineering
 Threat
 Vulnerability

Institutions with MSIA Degree Programs 

Institutions in the United States that have a Master of Science in Information Assurance degree program include:
 Capitol Technology University
 Dakota State University
 Florida Institute of Technology
 Georgia Institute of Technology
 Iowa State University
 Johns Hopkins University
 Northeastern University
 Norwich University
 Oklahoma State University
 Regis University
 Robert Morris University
 St. Cloud State University
 University of Alabama Huntsville
 Western Governors University
 Wilmington University, New Castle Delaware

See also 
 List of master's degrees
 Committee on National Security Systems
 ISACA
 National Information Assurance Training and Education Center
 Standards Organizations and Standards

References

Master's degrees